Deans, Ontario, may refer to various places in Ontario, Canada:
 Deans, a ghost town in the township of Laurier in the Unorganized North East Parry Sound District
 Deans Township, Ontario, a geographic township in Sudbury District
 Deans, another name for Indiana, Ontario, a ghost town in Seneca Township, Haldimand County